John Rummel Hamilton (January 16, 1887 – October 15, 1958) was an American actor who appeared in many movies and television programs, including the role as the blustery newspaper editor Perry White in the 1950s television program Adventures of Superman.

Biography
John Hamilton was born in Shippensburg, Pennsylvania, to John M. Hamilton and his wife Cornelia J. (Hollar) Hamilton. Hamilton was the youngest of four children, and his mother died eight days after his birth. Hamilton grew up in neighboring Southampton Township, Pennsylvania, where his father worked as a store clerk.

Hamilton's father was also appointed Shippensburg's trustee for the State Superintendent of Public Education, allowing Hamilton to attend college at Dickinson College and Shippensburg State Teacher's College. He opted to forgo teaching for a stage career, however.

After becoming an actor, he worked in Broadway plays and in touring theatrical companies for many years prior to his 1930 movie debut. He was in the original Broadway company of the 1922 play Seventh Heaven and would appear in the movie remake (Seventh Heaven) in 1937. He featured with Donald Meek in a series of short mysteries based on S.S. Van Dine stories for Warner Brothers. He played various types of characters, but most often figures of authority like judges and lawyers, politicans and commissioners, doctors and military officers. He appeared in more than three hundred movies, movie serials or television programs from the 1930s through the 1950s. 

Amomg other roles, Hamilton appeared as a judge who passes sentence on soon-to-be-racketeer James Cagney for violation of the Volstead Act in "The Roaring Twenties" (1939).  Hamilton also appeared as a police inspector in the John Huston film In This Our Life in 1942, and got several lines as DA Bryan quizzing Humphrey Bogart's Sam Spade in The Maltese Falcon (1941). He also played Professor Gordon in Flash Gordon Conquers the Universe (1940) and eventually the Daily Planet newspaper editor Perry White in the 1950s television series Adventures of Superman (1952–1958). After that, he appeared in television commercials for a brand of bifocals termed "Inviso No-Line Glasses".

Death
John Hamilton died on October 15, 1958 in Hollywood, California of heart failure at the age of 71. He was survived by a son. He was interred in Hollywood Forever Cemetery.

Selected filmography

 Dangerous Nan McGrew (1930) - Grant
 Heads Up (1930) - Capt. Whitney
 Success (1931) - The Father
 Rare Auto and Travel Thrills (1933)
 Keep 'Em Rolling (1934) - Major in France Battlefield (uncredited)
 Stand Up and Cheer! (1934) - Presidential Naval Aide (uncredited)
 Parole! (1936) - Police Inspector Hamilton (uncredited)
 The Final Hour (1936) - Department of Justice Chief (uncredited)
 Two-Fisted Gentleman (1936) - Frank Boyd
 Craig's Wife (1936) - Detective (uncredited)
 Two in a Crowd (1936) - Purdy
 Adventure in Manhattan (1936) - Chief of G-Men (uncredited)
 Legion of Terror (1936) - Cummings
 Love Letters of a Star (1936) - (uncredited)
 Three Smart Girls (1936) - Police Lieutenant (uncredited)
 Lady from Nowhere (1936) - Commissioner
 A Man Betrayed (1936) - Mr. Carlton
 Breezing Home (1937) - Chairman (uncredited)
 Two Wise Maids (1937) - Grover Wentworth
 Her Husband Lies (1937) - First Plainclothesman (uncredited)
 Seventh Heaven (1937) - Gendarme
 I Promise to Pay (1937) - Martin (uncredited)
 Criminals of the Air (1937) - Captain Wallace
 This Is My Affair (1937) - Warden
 Fifty Roads to Town (1937) - Captain Carroll
 Married Before Breakfast (1937) - Plainclothesman at Pier (uncredited)
 It Could Happen to You (1937) - Judge
 She Had to Eat (1937) - Police Captain (uncredited)
 The Singing Marine (1937) - Marine Colonel in Shanghai (uncredited)
 Bad Guy (1937) - Warden
 On Such a Night (1937) - Army Officer (uncredited)
 The Man Who Cried Wolf (1937) - A Judge (uncredited)
 That Certain Woman (1937) - American (scenes deleted)
 One Hundred Men and a Girl (1937) - Theatre Manager (uncredited)
 Dangerously Yours (1937) - Roberts (uncredited)
 Night Club Scandal (1937) - Governor
 Missing Witnesses (1937) - Police Chief Elmer H. Davis (uncredited)
 Murder Is News (1937) - David Corning
 Mr. Moto's Gamble (1938) - Philip Benton
 Over the Wall (1938) - Warden
 Doctor Rhythm (1938) - Insp. Bryce
 Hunted Men (1938) - Commissioner Police (uncredited)
 You Can't Take It with You (1938) - Kirby's Dining Guest (uncredited)
 Boys Town (1938) - Warden (uncredited)
 Personal Secretary (1938) - Truesdale (uncredited)
 Too Hot to Handle (1938) - Mr. Fairfield (uncredited)
 Mr. Wong, Detective (1938) - Simon Dayton
 Girls on Probation (1938) - Police Chief (uncredited)
 I Stand Accused (1938) - Defense Attorney Brower
 Angels with Dirty Faces (1938) - Police Captain (uncredited)
 Devil's Island (1939) - Captain of Second Convict Ship (uncredited)
 My Son Is a Criminal (1939) - Policeman (uncredited)
 Secret Service of the Air (1939) - Warden Jackson (uncredited)
 The Spirit of Culver (1939) - Maj. White
 Inside Story (1939) - Judge (uncredited)
 Three Smart Girls Grow Up (1939) - Harry - Conference Room Businessman (uncredited)
 First Offenders (1939) - Sheriff Slavin
 Blind Alley (1939) - Warden (uncredited)
 Forged Passport (1939) - Jack Rogers
 Confessions of a Nazi Spy (1939) - FBI Chief (uncredited)
 Rose of Washington Square (1939) - Judge
 It Could Happen to You (1939) - Minor Role (uncredited)
 Stronger Than Desire (1939) - Second Trial Judge (uncredited)
 The Forgotten Woman (1939) - Dr. May
 Waterfront (1939) - Detective Captain (uncredited)
 They Shall Have Music (1939) - Detective (uncredited)
 I Stole a Million (1939) - Dist. Atty. Wilson
 The Angels Wash Their Faces (1939) - Officer Merton (uncredited)
 Full Confession (1939) - The Judge (uncredited)
 Dust Be My Destiny (1939) - First Warden (uncredited)
 Espionage Agent (1939) - Code Room Instructor (uncredited)
 Smashing the Money Ring (1939) - Night Captain
 On Dress Parade (1939) - A Co. Maneuvers Colonel (uncredited)
 The Roaring Twenties (1939) - Judge
 Call a Messenger (1939) - Police Lt. Nelson (uncredited)
 Swanee River (1939) - Doctor (uncredited)
 Invisible Stripes (1939) - Captain Johnson (uncredited)
 Oh Johnny, How You Can Love (1940) - Jonathan Archer (uncredited)
 Brother Rat and a Baby (1940) - Judge (uncredited)
 Dr. Ehrlich's Magic Bullet (1940) - Hirsch (uncredited)
 Three Cheers for the Irish (1940) - Eddie - the Judge (uncredited)
 Johnny Apollo (1940) - Judge
 Flash Gordon Conquers the Universe (1940, Serial) - Professor Gordon [Chs. 1, 4]
 Tear Gas Squad (1940) - Chief Ferris
 Murder in the Air (1940) - Agent Hargrave (uncredited)
 The Man Who Talked Too Much (1940) - Governor (uncredited)
 They Drive by Night (1940) - Defense Attorney (uncredited)
 The Golden Fleecing (1940) - Judge (uncredited)
 Boom Town (1940) - McMasters' Defense Attorney (uncredited)
 Fugitive from a Prison Camp (1940) - Minor Role (uncredited)
 Tugboat Annie Sails Again (1940) - Capt. Broad
 Lady with Red Hair (1940) - Defense Attorney Graham (uncredited)
 The Great Plane Robbery (1940) - Dr. Jamison
 Flight Command (1940) - Pensacola Commander (uncredited)
 Cheers for Miss Bishop (1941) - President Watts
 Flight from Destiny (1941) - Judge (uncredited)
 Meet John Doe (1941) - Jim (uncredited)
 Strange Alibi (1941) - Judge in Geary Trial (uncredited)
 World Premiere (1941) - Bronson (uncredited)
 Hold Back the Dawn (1941) - Mac - Studio Receptionist (uncredited)
 Nine Lives Are Not Enough (1941) - Police Chief Turner (uncredited)
 It Started with Eve (1941) - Thomas - Headwaiter (uncredited)
 Passage from Hong Kong (1941) - Capt. Shouse (uncredited)
 The Maltese Falcon (1941) - District Attorney Bryan
 Blues in the Night (1941) - Doctor Treating Jigger (uncredited)
 They Died with Their Boots On (1941) - Colonel (uncredited)
 I Killed That Man (1941) - District Attorney
 Borrowed Hero (1941) - William Brooks
 The Body Disappears (1941) - Trial Judge (uncredited)
 Pacific Blackout (1941) - Police Captain (uncredited)
 Always in My Heart (1942) - Warden
 To the Shores of Tripoli (1942) - Gen. Gordon (scenes deleted)
 I Was Framed (1942) - Judge (uncredited)
 The Great Man's Lady (1942) - Sen. Grant
 In This Our Life (1942) - Police Inspector Millett
 Dr. Broadway (1942) - Joe - Inspector (uncredited)
 Syncopation (1942) - Mr. Ames (uncredited)
 Yankee Doodle Dandy (1942) - Recruiting Major (uncredited)
 The Big Shot (1942) - Judge
 Wings for the Eagle (1942) - Mr. Archer (uncredited)
 Escape from Crime (1942) - Rafferty
 Enemy Agents Meet Ellery Queen (1942) - Bracken - The Police Commissioner
 Across the Pacific (1942) - Court-Martial President
 Phantom Killer (1942) - John G. Harrison
 Lucky Jordan (1942) - Colonel (scenes deleted)
 Over My Dead Body (1942) - District Attorney Stuart Drinkwater
 Tennessee Johnson (1942) - State Chairman (uncredited)
 G-Men vs. the Black Dragon (1943, Serial) - Raymond Martin (uncredited)
 Aerial Gunner (1943) - Doctor (uncredited)
 Mission to Moscow (1943) - Charlie - American Newsman (uncredited)
 Daredevils of the West (1943, Serial) - Sen. Garfield [Ch. 8]
 Good Luck, Mr. Yates (1943) - J.C. Allison (uncredited)
 Gals, Incorporated (1943) - Doctor (uncredited)
 The Adventures of a Rookie (1943) - Col. Wilson (uncredited)
 So's Your Uncle (1943) - Mr. Craig
 Larceny with Music (1943) - Important banker
 Crazy House (1943) - Outraged Director (uncredited)
 Government Girl (1943) - Irate Man (uncredited)
 Swingtime Johnny (1943) - Caldwell
 What a Woman! (1943) - Senator (uncredited)
 Rookies in Burma (1943) - Army Major (uncredited)
 Standing Room Only (1944) - General (uncredited)
 Captain America (1944, Serial) - G.F. Hillman [Chs. 13-14]
 Up in Arms (1944) - Businessman in Theatre Lobby (uncredited)
 Action in Arabia (1944) - Mr. Hamilton (uncredited)
 Hi, Good Lookin'! (1944) - Mr. McGillicuddy (uncredited)
 Man from Frisco (1944) - Governor (uncredited)
 Goodnight, Sweetheart (1944) - District Attorney (uncredited)
 Christmas Holiday (1944) - Jury Foreman (uncredited)
 Allergic to Love (1944) - Dr. McLaughlan
 Wilson (1944) - Legislator in Wilson's Office (uncredited)
 The Girl Who Dared (1944) - Beau Richmond
 The Port of 40 Thieves (1944) - Mr. Fellows
 Maisie Goes to Reno (1944) -Judge Carter (uncredited)
 The Doughgirls (1944) - Businessman in Lobby (uncredited)
 Shadow of Suspicion (1944) - Mr. R.M. Cartell
 Music in Manhattan (1944) - Mr. Bradley, the Banker (uncredited)
 I'm from Arkansas (1944) - Harry Cashin - Vice President of Slowe Packing Company
 Zorro's Black Whip (1944, Serial) - Mr. Walsh - Banker [Chs.1-3,10-12]
 My Gal Loves Music (1944) - Doctor (uncredited)
 Army Wives (1944) - Gen. Lowry (uncredited)
 Crazy Knights (1944) - Mr. Gardner
 Hi, Beautiful (1944) - Board Member (uncredited)
 Meet Miss Bobby Socks (1944) - R. N. Swanson (uncredited)
 Lake Placid Serenade (1944) - Hopkins (uncredited)
 Sheriff of Las Vegas (1944) - Judge Homer T. Blackwell
 Mom and Dad (1945) - Dr. Burnell
 The Great Flamarion (1945) - Coroner (uncredited)
 Strange Illusion (1945) - Bill Allen
 Circumstantial Evidence (1945) - Gov. Hanlon
 I'll Tell the World (1945) - President (uncredited)
 The Naughty Nineties (1945) - Sheriff of Ironville (uncredited)
 On Stage Everybody (1945) - Mr. Smoothasilk (uncredited)
 Incendiary Blonde (1945) - Judge (uncredited)
 First Yank Into Tokyo (1945) - Dr. Stacey (uncredited)
 Sensation Hunters (1945) - Night Court Judge (uncredited)
 Johnny Angel (1945) - Harbor Master (uncredited)
 Voice of the Whistler (1945) - Doctor (uncredited)
 Northwest Trail (1945) - John Owens
 Girl on the Spot (1946) - Police Commissioner (uncredited)
 Because of Him (1946) - Critic (uncredited)
 The Phantom Rider (1946, Serial) - Sen. Williams [Chs. 7-8]
 The Madonna's Secret (1946) - Lambert
 Blondie's Lucky Day (1946) - Mr. Emory (uncredited)
 Johnny Comes Flying Home (1946) - C.H. Metters (uncredited)
 Home on the Range (1946) - State Official
 Badman's Territory (1946) - Commissioner Taylor (uncredited)
 One Exciting Week (1946) - Dr. Jones (uncredited)
 Renegades (1946) - Prosecuting Attorney (uncredited)
 Shadows Over Chinatown (1946) - Pronnet (uncredited)
 The Mysterious Mr. M (1946, Serial) - Dr. Kittridge (uncredited)
 Step by Step (1946) - Police Capt. Edmonds (uncredited)
 The Brute Man (1946) - Professor Cushman (uncredited)
 Wife Wanted (1946) - Judge (uncredited)
 The Secret of the Whistler (1946) - McLaren aka Mac (uncredited)
 Magnificent Doll (1946) - Mr. Witherspoon (uncredited)
 Raiders of the South (1947) - General Lawton
 I'll Be Yours (1947) - Board Chairman (uncredited)
 The Devil on Wheels (1947) - Mr. Davis (uncredited)
 The Beginning or the End (1947) - Dr. Harold C. Urey
 The Sea of Grass (1947) - Forrest Hamilton (uncredited)
 It Happened on Fifth Avenue (1947) - Harper (uncredited)
 Violence (1947) - Doctor Chalmers
 New Orleans (1947) - Police Chief (uncredited)
 That's My Gal (1947) - Assemblyman McBride
 Too Many Winners (1947) - Albert Payson
 The Trouble with Women (1947) - 2nd Judge
 The Secret Life of Walter Mitty (1947) - Dr. Remington (uncredited)
 News Hounds (1947) - Timothy X. 'Big Tim' Donlin
 The Unfinished Dance (1947) - Dr. Philburn (uncredited)
 The Foxes of Harrow (1947) - Ship's Cargo Official (uncredited)
 Key Witness (1947) - R. C. Hurlbert - Coroner (uncredited)
 Blondie in the Dough (1947) - Premier Biscuit Board Member (uncredited)
 The Fabulous Texan (1947) - President Ulysses S. Grant (uncredited)
 Bandits of Dark Canyon (1947) - Ben Shaw
 High Wall (1947) - Police Surgeon (uncredited)
 Song of My Heart (1948) - Czar
 The Judge Steps Out (1948) - Diner on Train (uncredited)
 The Gallant Legion (1948) - Speaker of the House (uncredited)
 The Checkered Coat (1948) - Marcus Anson
 Return of the Bad Men (1948) - Doc Greene (uncredited)
 The Babe Ruth Story (1948) - Businessman (uncredited)
 Walk a Crooked Mile (1948) - G.W. Hunter (uncredited)
 The Gentleman from Nowhere (1948) - Judge (uncredited)
 Desperadoes of Dodge City (1948) - Land Agent
 In This Corner (1948) - Admiral in Harris' Office
 Rusty Leads the Way (1948) - Board Member (uncredited)
 Sheriff of Wichita (1949) - Prison Warden
 The Judge (1949) - Lt. Edwards
 The Undercover Man (1949)
 Addio Mimí! (1949) - Doctor
 Canadian Pacific (1949) - Pere Lacomb
 Law of the Golden West (1949) - Isaac Cody, Bill's father
 The Wyoming Bandit (1949) - Marshal
 Bandit King of Texas (1949) - Marshal John Turner
 The James Brothers of Missouri (1949, Serial) - Lon Royer [Ch.1]
 Strange Bargain (1949) - Employee at Meeting (uncredited)
 Fighting Man of the Plains (1949) - Currier
 Alias the Champ (1949) - Police Commissioner Bronson
 Prison Warden (1949) - Mr. Webb (uncredited)
 Pioneer Marshal (1949) - Man with Bracelet
 Bodyhold (1949) - Commissioner Harley
 Davy Crockett, Indian Scout (1950) - Col. Pollard
 Bells of Coronado (1950) - Mr. Linden, Insurance Company Official
 Military Academy with That Tenth Avenue Gang (1950) - Judge Ralph Townsend
 The Reformer and the Redhead (1950) - Police Captain (uncredited)
 The Invisible Monster (1950, Serial) - Henry Miller [Chs. 1, 8, 12] (uncredited)
 Annie Get Your Gun (1950) - Ship Captain (uncredited)
 Duchess of Idaho (1950) - Board Member (uncredited)
 The Men (1950) - Justice of the Peace (uncredited)
 Bunco Squad (1950) - John Deming (uncredited)
 I'll Get By (1950) - Marine General (uncredited)
 Right Cross (1950) - Horse Owner (unconfirmed)
 The Missourians (1950) - Mayor Grant McDowall
 The Du Pont Story (1950) - Military Officer (uncredited)
 The Magnificent Yankee (1950) - Justice White (uncredited)
 The Flying Missile (1950) - Second Senator (uncredited)
 Al Jennings of Oklahoma (1951) - Schyler (uncredited)
 Belle Le Grand (1951) - Broker (uncredited)
 Sugarfoot (1951) - Judge Backus (uncredited)
 Night Riders of Montana (1951) - Doctor (uncredited)
 Inside Straight (1951) - Jim Walters (uncredited)
 Badman's Gold (1951) - The Marshal
 The Great Caruso (1951) - Forrest DeWitt - Charity High Bidder (uncredited)
 Million Dollar Pursuit (1951) - Police Inspector Morgan
 The Guy Who Came Back (1951) - Admiral (uncredited)
 Criminal Lawyer (1951) - Police Captain Loomis (uncredited)
 The Pace That Thrills (1952) - Sour Puss
 Target (1952) - Bailey
 Listen,Judge(1952) - Three Stooges short 
 Cripple Creek (1952) - San Francisco Postmaster (uncredited)
 The Rose Bowl Story (1952) - Dr. Lansing (uncredited)
 Million Dollar Mermaid (1952) - Skeptic in Rector's Restaurant (uncredited)
 Never Wave at a WAC (1953) - Sen. Holbrook (uncredited)
 Marshal of Cedar Rock (1953) - Stover - Prison Warden
 Jack McCall, Desperado (1953) - Col. Cornish
 Iron Mountain Trail (1953) - Circuit Judge
 Run for the Hills (1953) - Mr. Harvester
 So This Is Love (1953) - Charlie, Show Backer (uncredited)
 El Paso Stampede (1953) - Rancher White (uncredited)
 Donovan's Brain (1953) - Mr. MacNish, Bank Manager (uncredited)
 Man of Conflict (1953) - Cornwall
 Sitting Bull (1954) - Clifton Staley (uncredited)
 The Night of the Hunter (1955) - Townsman Who Greets Rachel (uncredited)
 Bobby Ware Is Missing (1955) - Stearns - Goodwin's Associate (uncredited)
 Chicago Confidential (1957) - Attorney Emory Morgan (uncredited)
 Outcasts of the City (1958)
 Adventures of Superman (1952-1958, TV Series) - Perry White (final appearance)

References

External links

American male television actors
Film producers from Pennsylvania
American male screenwriters
Songwriters from Pennsylvania
1887 births
1958 deaths
Film directors from Pennsylvania
Burials at Hollywood Forever Cemetery
People from Shippensburg, Pennsylvania
20th-century American male actors
Screenwriters from Pennsylvania
20th-century American male writers
20th-century American screenwriters